José de Jesús Noé (1805 – 17 March 1862) was a Californio politician, soldier, and ranchero, who served as the 7th and 12th Alcalde of San Francisco. He is the last Hispanic Californian (Californio) to serve as Mayor of San Francisco.

Life
In 1845, Noé was granted the land known as Rancho San Miguel, which covered the neighborhoods now known as Noe Valley, Eureka Valley, Fairmont Heights, Glen Park and Sunnyside.

Following U.S. military occupation of Yerba Buena in the Mexican–American War, Noé became alcalde again in 1846, becoming the last man born in Mexico to serve in that office (the office of alcalde was abolished with adoption of the California Constitution in 1849). Noé was appointed alcalde by U.S. Navy Commodore Robert F. Stockton, under his authority as military governor of the occupied territory. Also appointed alcalde, and serving concurrently with Noé, was Navy Lt. Washington Allon Bartlett. As a military officer, Bartlett was a direct representative of the military governor, functionally similar to the office of prefect in the Mexican system. One of the last acts of the Noé/Bartlett year was to rename Yerba Buena to its current name, San Francisco.

Following his death in 1862, Noé was interred at Mission San Francisco de Asís.

Notes

References
 Theodore Grivas (1963). Military governments in California, 1846-1850; with a chapter on their prior use in Louisiana, Florida, and New Mexico. Glendale, Calif: A.H. Clark Co.
 

Mayors of San Francisco
1805 births
1862 deaths
People of Alta California

19th-century American politicians